Ibra Sekajja (born 31 October 1992) is a Ugandan professional footballer who plays as a striker for AC Oulu in the Veikkausliiga.

Career
Born in Uganda, he attended secondary school at Ashburton Community School from 2004 to 2009.

Ibra was first noticed by a scout from Crystal Palace a Premier League club for his footballing talent whilst playing during a match at Elmwood Primary School. His pace, technical skill, dribbling, height and striking were noticed at the age of 10.

Sekajja made his professional debut for Crystal Palace on 30 April 2011, in a fixture at Hull City. He scored a late 88th-minute equaliser with his first touch. Sekajja had dominated the pitch in the last few vital minutes of the match, ensuring a draw against Hull which secured Palace's safety in the Championship. He celebrated with a triple backflip.

He was loaned to Kettering Town and Bromley midway through the 2011–12 season, to gain first team experience. 
Milton Keynes Dons then signed Sekajja on loan on 7 November 2012. Manager Karl Robinson said of the move, "He's exactly what we need in the team at the moment – he is young, fearless and fast." On 24 November 2012 he made his only appearance for the side, coming on as an 84th-minute substitute for Dean Bowditch in a 5–1 win against Colchester United

On 10 January 2013, Sekajja joined Barnet on a one-month loan. He made a winning start to his Barnet career, playing the whole game in an away 2–0 win against Rotherham United, on 12 January 2013. Following his "impressive" debut, manager Edgar Davids said "I expect that he is going to be a great asset for the team. I hope he develops himself in the line that I think he can and he can become an important player for Barnet."

At the end of his loan at Barnet, Sekajja returned to Crystal Palace but failed to feature again in the first team. He was eventually released by the club in May 2014.

After a successful two-week trial, Sekajja signed for Scottish Premiership club Inverness CT in October 2014. He made his debut for the team later that month, coming on as a substitute against St Mirren. Sekajja left Inverness in January 2015, at the end of his short-term contract.

On 16 January 2015, Sekajja signed for Scottish Championship club Livingston.

Following spells with Braintree Town and Hemel Hempstead Town during the 2015–16 season, Sekajja joined Dulwich Hamlet of the Isthmian League Premier Division, making his debut in a 2–2 away draw with Enfield Town on 1 October 2016. He finished his first season at the club scoring 17 goals in all competitions, including a first-half hat-trick against Enfield Town in the Isthmian League Premier Division play-off semi-final. After 12 league goals for Dulwich in 2016–17, he joined Bognor Regis Town for 2017–18. In 2018-19 Sekajja played for Havant & Waterlooville before joining Gosport Borough in March.

Sekajja joined Maidenhead United in November 2019. In January 2020, he went on trial at Grimsby Town.

Sekajja re-joined Dulwich Hamlet in January 2021.

On 15 August 2022, he signed with AC Oulu in Finland until the end of the season.

International career
Sekajja has been capped by England at U16 level. In August 2013, he was called up to the Uganda squad for a friendly against Egypt. He did not play as he had yet to receive his Ugandan passport.

Career statistics

References

External links
 
 
 Ibra Sekajja at Dulwich Hamlet F.C.
 

1992 births
Living people
English footballers
Ugandan footballers
Black British sportspeople
English people of Ugandan descent
England youth international footballers
Association football forwards
Crystal Palace F.C. players
Kettering Town F.C. players
Bromley F.C. players
Milton Keynes Dons F.C. players
Barnet F.C. players
Inverness Caledonian Thistle F.C. players
Livingston F.C. players
Braintree Town F.C. players
Hemel Hempstead Town F.C. players
Dulwich Hamlet F.C. players
Bognor Regis Town F.C. players
Havant & Waterlooville F.C. players
Gosport Borough F.C. players
Maidenhead United F.C. players
AC Oulu players
English Football League players
National League (English football) players
Isthmian League players
Scottish Professional Football League players
Southern Football League players
Veikkausliiga players
Ugandan expatriate footballers
Expatriate footballers in Finland
Ugandan expatriate sportspeople in Finland